Valentin Erben (born 1945 in Vienna) is an Austrian cellist.

Life 
He studied with Walter Reichardt in Munich, Tobias Kühne in Vienna and André Navarra in Paris. In 1970, he became a charter member of the Alban Berg Quartett, with which he played for 38 years. He has taught cello at the Hochschule für Musik Vienna since 1972. He also teaches at the University of Cologne, the Chigiana Academy in Siena, and ProQuartet in Paris.

He won the International Cello Competition in Vienna and the ARD International Music Competition in Munich.

He was a founding member of the Alban Berg Quartet and played with that group for 38 years.

References

External links
Erben's website
Biography

1945 births
Living people
Musicians from Vienna
Austrian classical cellists
Academic staff of the University of Music and Performing Arts Vienna
20th-century Austrian musicians
20th-century Austrian male musicians
20th-century classical musicians
Prize-winners of the ARD International Music Competition
20th-century cellists